Pedro de Moya (1610–1660) was a Spanish painter of the Baroque period.

Born in Granada, he was first trained under Juan del Castillo in Seville. He enlisted as a soldier for the armies in Flanders. Upon his discharge in 1641, he traveled to London. From there he returned to Seville and Granada. He painted mostly religious paintings.  His works included the Vision of Santa Maria Magdalena de Pazzis, painted on oil on linen.

References

Gómez Moreno, Manuel, Una obra firmada por Pedro de Moya, Archivo Español de Arte y Arqueología, 9 (1927).
Montaner López, Emilia, Más sobre Pedro de Moya (More about Pedro de Moya), Boletín del Seminario de Arte y Arqueología, vol. 52 (1986), p. 469-473.
Orozco Díaz, Emilio, Tres obras probables de Pedro de Moya desaparecidas (Three Possible Lost Works of Pedro de Moya), Cuadernos de Arte, IV, Granada 1937

External links

 Museo de Bellas Artes de Granada: Visión de Santa María Magdalena de Pazzis. 

17th-century Spanish painters
Spanish male painters
People from Granada
Spanish Baroque painters
Painters from Seville
1610 births
1660 deaths